Susanne Rosenqvist (born 26 November 1967) is a Swedish sprint canoer and marathon canoeist who competed in the 1990s. Competing in two Summer Olympics, she won two bronze medals in the K-4 500 m event (1992, 1996).

Rosenqvist also won seven medals at the ICF Canoe Sprint World Championships with three silvers (K-2 200 m: 1995, K-2 5000 m: 1991, K-4 500 m: 1993) and four bronzes (K-2 500 m: 1995, K-4 200 m: 1995, 1997; K-4 500 m: 1994).

References
DatabaseOlympics.com profile

Sports-reference.com profile

1967 births
Canoeists at the 1992 Summer Olympics
Canoeists at the 1996 Summer Olympics
Living people
Olympic canoeists of Sweden
Olympic bronze medalists for Sweden
Swedish female canoeists
Olympic medalists in canoeing
ICF Canoe Sprint World Championships medalists in kayak
Medalists at the 1996 Summer Olympics
Medalists at the 1992 Summer Olympics